The Indian Institute of Surveying & Mapping (IISM), formerly known as Survey Training Institute, is an institution of Survey Education, learning and training. It is situated at the Survey of India campus in Uppal, Hyderabad.

History

Survey of India, the National Survey Organisation of the Government of India was established in 1767. In Post-independence India, the developmental activities and need for defence preparedness brought urgent need to impart training to officers and staff in various aspects of surveying and mapping with state-of-the-art technologies. With this objective, the Centre for Survey Training and Map Production was established at Hyderabad in 1967 with a Human Resource Development Institute within Survey of India under technical assistance from United Nations Development Programme (UNDP). The Indian Institute of Surveying & Mapping(erstwhile  Survey Training Institute) thus raised on 6 May 1967 is now recognized as a training establishment in the field of Surveying and Cartography to impart training to the Officers and Staff of Survey of India and other Government Organisations, Private Individuals, and Scholars from other Afro-Asian countries.

The other Directorates of Survey of India located within the complex, viz.,Printing Zone, AP Geo-spatial Data Centre, Southern Printing Group and GIS & Remote Sensing Directorate are rendering faculty assistance as and when required. Besides, Indian Institute of Surveying & Mapping engages experts from external sources especially in the field of management and remote sensing, for faculty support. The facilities of IISM Library, abounding in authentic books on surveying, cartography and various allied subjects are available to all trainees. Internet facility has now been provided in the library, thus facilitating access for trainees and faculty to the resources available in the electronic media.  Furnished hostels for trainees with boarding facilities are situated in the campus.

Survey Education
Introduction of innovative surveying systems such as the Global Positioning System, Electronic Distance Measurement, digital levels and theodolites, Laser scanners, digital sensors, high resolution satellite imageries etc., has revolutionised the scope of spatial data collection. However, on account of deficiencies in our system of Survey Education and practices, many of these technologies have yet to acquire the status of enabling technology in India.

Broadly, the ethos can be attributed to two main reasons - the Survey Education, by itself, being not popular as a discipline of science and there being no regularatory standards to control the practices of collecting spatial data. A lot of spatial data being generated by various institutions using high-end technology by untrained manpower, being inconsistent in accuracies and unrelated to any meta-data standards on account of lack of professional supervision, cannot be put to universal use in a multi-disciplinary environment.

Such efforts, although meeting a limited requirement, do not contribute to the national need of a standardised spatial data base and are often found wanting in accuracy when integrated with a regional or national perspective. For deriving full benefits and optimising the use of resources, knowledge of the fundamentals of land surveying and various methodologies of interfacing them with the new technologies has, therefore, become an inescapable requirement for all technologists and planners engaged in generation and manipulation of spatial information.

Survey Education deals with the concepts and methodologies of gathering, processing and representing geo-spatial data in a defined form and format. It encompasses education on theories and practices in disciplines of geodesy, geo-physics, photogrammetry, land surveying, cartography and reprography. With the introduction of computers and change of emphasis from analogue to digital technology and high expectations from GIS, computer sciences and various systems for generation of spatial data bases have become an integral part of survey education.

To keep pace with the present day requirement of spatial data, education on the modern tools of data gathering such as GPS, Digital Photogrammetry, laser ranging, remote sensing etc., and associated technologies in visualization of spatial data, has acquired a special place in Survey Education. Despite the sophistication in technology, need-based emphasis on accuracies, reliability and consistency in data generation remain the cardinal principle in Survey Education.

Additional Surveyor General: P. V. Srinivas

Deputy Surveyor General (Tech): S. K. Sinha

Deputy Surveyor General (Adm): Col. Sareen Chander

External links
Official website of IISM Hyderabad
Official website of the Survey of India

Geography of India
National mapping agencies
Surveying of India
Government agencies of India
Organisations based in Hyderabad, India
1967 establishments in Andhra Pradesh
Surveying organizations
Government agencies established in 1967